Countess Praskovya Aleksandrovna Bruce (Прасковья Александровна Брюс; née Rumyantseva; 1729–1785) was a Russian 
lady-in-waiting and noble, confidant of Catherine the Great.

Life

She was the sister of Marshal Pyotr Rumyantsev and married to Count James Bruce, governor of Saint Petersburg.

She became the lady-in-waiting of Catherine soon after Catherine's arrival in Russia in 1744 and continued in that position after Catherine's elevation to the throne in 1762. Bruce was described as an attractive woman and as the "right hand" of Catherine. Bruce was called "Brussja" by Catherine, who entrusted her with her most intimate personal affairs. Catherine said that Bruce was "the person to whom I can say everything, without fear of the consequences". Bruce was described as Catherine's closest confidant in her private affairs.

Bruce is best known in history as l'éprouveuse for the role that she allegedly played in Catherine's love life. According to legend, Bruce would "test" any prospective lovers sexually before they became the lovers of Catherine after they had been suggested by Grigory Potemkin, chosen by Catherine and examined by a doctor. The same role has been attributed to Bruce's successor as lady-in-waiting, Anna Protasova. That is unconfirmed, and it is unknown how much truth there is, despite that being a well-reported story in history.

Bruce played an important role in developing the relationship between Catherine and Potemkin, notably as a messenger, and played that role until the relationship was consummated in 1773. Bruce was then given the task persuading Potemkin to leave his exile and enter a relationship with Catherine. 

In 1779, Catherine was directed into a room and witnessed her latest lover, Ivan Rimsky-Korsakov, having sex with Bruce. The person who directed her is believed to have been Aleksandra von Engelhardt on the order of Potemkin, who wished for the removal of both Korsakov and Bruce from court. That resulted in the fall of both Korsakov and Bruce. Korsakov was sent in exile to Moscow. 

Bruce soon followed him, but the relationship of Bruce and Korsakov soon ended. She returned to her spouse and was dismissed as a lady-in-waiting and replaced by Anna Protasova (1745–1826), the cousin of Alexej Orlov, who is mentioned as l'éprouveuse in the poems of Lord Byron.

In popular culture
Bruce is played by Gina McKee in the 2019 TV miniseries Catherine the Great.

See also
 Maria Choglokova

References 
 Simon Sebag-Montefiore : Potemkin och Katarina den stora (2005)
 Marie Tetzlaff : Katarina den stora (1998)

Countesses of the Russian Empire
Ladies-in-waiting from the Russian Empire
1729 births
18th-century people from the Russian Empire
1785 deaths
Court of Catherine the Great